Greenwell Point is a town in the Shoalhaven region of New South Wales, Australia. It is about 13 km east of Nowra on the South Coast.

References 

Towns in New South Wales
Towns in the South Coast (New South Wales)
City of Shoalhaven